Rechka-Kormikha is a rural locality (a settlement) in Novoyegoryevsky Selsoviet, Yegoryevsky District, Altai Krai, Russia. The population was 7 as of 2013.

Geography 
Rechka-Kormikha is located on the Kormikha River, 24 km northwest of Novoyegoryevskoye (the district's administrative centre) by road. Novosovetsky is the nearest rural locality.

References 

Rural localities in Yegoryevsky District, Altai Krai